The 1993 Toronto Argonauts finished in fourth place in the East Division with a 3–15 record and failed to make the playoffs, ending up just one win behind playoff bound Ottawa.

Offseason

Regular season

Standings

Schedule

Awards and honours
CFLPA's Most Outstanding Community Service Award – Michael "Pinball" Clemons

1993 CFL All-Stars
None

References

Toronto Argonauts seasons
1993 Canadian Football League season by team
1993 in Toronto